Henry Bolton may refer to:

Henry Bolton (Australian politician) (1842–1900), politician in Victoria
Henry Carrington Bolton (1843–1903), American chemist and bibliographer 
Henry Bolton (British politician) (born 1963), former leader of the UK Independence Party (2017–2018)

See also
Henry John Boulton (1790–1870), 19th century lawyer, judge and political figure in Upper Canada